Melanogaster ("black-bellied") may refer to the following organisms:
 Genera:
 Melanogaster (fungus), a genus of false truffles
 Melanogaster (fly), a genus of hoverflies
 Species:
 Drosophila melanogaster, a species of fruit fly, widespread and also important in research
 Acheilognathus melanogaster, a species of brackish-freshwater ray-finned fish in Japan
 Anhinga melanogaster, the Oriental darter (snakebird), a water bird of tropical South Asia and Southeast Asia
 Turnix melanogaster, the black-breasted buttonquail (a rare bird in Australia)